The third Morgan government (26 May 2007 – 19 July 2007) was a caretaker Labour minority government in Wales.

Having won the largest number of seats in the 2007 general election (26 out of 60) the Labour Party sought to form a coalition with a smaller party. However, this proved impossible, with all the other parties discussing a possible anti-Labour coalition. The Labour Party chose to go into minority government, and Rhodri Morgan was re-elected first minister on 26 May 2007.

Cabinet

Junior ministers

See also 
Members of the 3rd National Assembly for Wales

References

Welsh governments
Ministries of Elizabeth II
2007 establishments in Wales
2007 disestablishments in Wales
Cabinets established in 2007
Cabinets disestablished in 2007